Naomi Kritzer is an American speculative fiction writer and blogger. Her 2015 short story "Cat Pictures Please" was a Locus Award and Hugo Award winner and was nominated for a Nebula Award. Her novel, Catfishing on CatNet won the 2020 Lodestar Award for Best Young Adult Book.

Biography 
Kritzer has lived in London and Nepal. She attended Wingra School - Madison, WI (1978 - 1986); Highgate Wood School - Haringey, England (1986 - 1987); Madison West High School - Madison, WI (1987 - 1991); and Carleton College - Northfield, MN (1991 - 1995). As of 2020, she lives in Saint Paul, Minnesota, and blogs on local elections.

Career 
Since 1999 Kritzer has published a number of short stories and several novels, including two trilogies for Bantam Books, and her Seastead series of short stories for The Magazine of Fantasy & Science Fiction. Her 2015 short story "Cat Pictures Please" published in Clarkesworld was a Locus Award and Hugo Award winner and was nominated for a Nebula Award.

Bibliography

Novel series

Eliana's Song 
 
 
 Story:
 "Kin" (2004)

Dead Rivers

CatNet

Collections 

 
  (2011)

Short fiction 

 "The Price" (2000)
 "Spirit Stone" (2000)
 "The Golem" (2000)
 "Comrade Grandmother" (2002)
 "In the Witch's Garden" (2002)
 "St. Ailbe's Hall" (2004) also appeared as:
 "The Long Walk" (2005) with Lyda Morehouse
 "Honest Man" (2007)
 "When Shlemiel Went to the Stars" (2008)
 "The Good Son" (2009)
 "Isabella's Garden" (2011)
 "What Happened at Blessing Creek" (2011)
 "Scrap Dragon" (2012)
 "Bits" (2013)
 "Cat Pictures Please" (2015)
 "Wind" (2015)
 "Cleanout" (2015)
 "So Much Cooking" (2015)

Awards

References

External links 
 

Living people
20th-century American women writers
20th-century American short story writers
21st-century American novelists
21st-century American short story writers
21st-century American women writers
American fantasy writers
American science fiction writers
American women short story writers
Analog Science Fiction and Fact people
Asimov's Science Fiction people
Hugo Award-winning writers
Place of birth missing (living people)
Women science fiction and fantasy writers
Year of birth missing (living people)
Novelists from North Carolina